Eurocom may refer to:
 Eurocom, a UK-based video game developer
 Eurocom Corporation, a Canadian laptop manufacturing company.
 Eurocom S.A., a marketing company that merged into Euro RSCG, later Havas Worldwide

See also 

 Eurecom, a French university